Filimonas endophytica is a Gram-negative bacterium from the genus of Filimonas which has been isolated from the roots of the plant Cosmos bipinnatus.

References

Chitinophagia
Bacteria described in 2015